Robert J. Anderson may refer to:

 Bobby Anderson (actor) (1933–2008), American actor and television producer
 Robert J. Anderson (public health administrator) (1914–1999), director of the Centers for Disease Control and Prevention